Pareeksha is a 1967 Indian Malayalam-language film, directed by P. Bhaskaran and written by T. N. Gopinathan Nair. It is based on Nair's 1964 play of the same name. The film stars Prem Nazir, Sharada, Adoor Bhasi and Thikkurissy Sukumaran Nair. The story details the corruption and malpractices in the education system and conduct of public examinations.

Filming was done at Vasu Studio. The film had a highly successful musical composition by M. S. Baburaj. Pareeksha released on 19 October 1967, and was a huge commercial success at the box office.

Plot 
Neelakanta Pillai lives in a village with his son Appu and daughter Parvathi. Appu fails in the SSLC examinations. Pillai's sister Lakshmi Amma also lives in the same village. Her son Vijayan, who works in Calcutta gets transferred to Ernakulam. Vijayan takes Appu along with him to provide coaching to the boy for the SSLC exams the following year.

Vijayan and Appu stay in a small house in Headmaster Janardhanan Pillai's compound. The headmaster is a friend of Neelakanta Pillai. Vijayan falls in love with Janardanan Pillai's daughter Yamuna and their families decide to get them married.

The SSLC examinations are over. Appu is doubtful of clearing his science exam. Janardanan Pillai is the evaluator of his paper. Neelakanta Pillai approaches Janardanan Pillai to know his son's result in advance. Appu fails to secure pass marks, managing to get only 26 marks, while the minimum pass mark is 35. A respected and honest teacher Janardanan Pillai refuses to give Appu extra marks.

Vijayan is indebted to his uncle Neelakantan Pillai. He assures him that he will influence Janardanan Pillai and that Appu will get through the examinations. But the Headmaster rejects Vijayan's request to manipulate the mark list. Vijayan forces Yamuna to get things done in his favour. Yamuna corrects the original marks. She changes 26 to 62 in the examination paper as well as the mark list.

Janardanan Pillai learns of his daughter's actions. He is shocked to find out, from his wife Bhageerathi, that Yamuna is pregnant and that Vijayan may withdraw from the marriage if Appu fails to clear the exams.

When Neelakantan Pillai learns of all this, he decides to meet Janardanan Pillai along with Vijayan and Appu to apologise and resolve the issue. But they are a trifle late. Janardanan Pillai dies, but only after he corrects the marks from 62 to the original in the exam paper and the mark list.

Cast 

Prem Nazir as Vijayan
Sharada as Yamuna
Adoor Bhasi as Ayyappan Pilla
Thikkurissy Sukumaran Nair as Janardhanan Pilla
Kottayam Santha
P. J. Antony
T. R. Omana
B. K. Pottekkad
Latheef
Aranmula Ponnamma
C. A. Balan
Khadeeja
Kuttan Pillai
Panjabi
Santo Krishnan
Ramesh
P. Bhaskaran

Soundtrack 
The music was composed by M. S. Baburaj, with lyrics by P. Bhaskaran. The songs were composed in Hindustani ragas. Assisted by R. K. Shekhar, the background score was arranged by M. B. Sreenivasan. Songs like "Oru Pushpam Mathramen" ( Desh ), "Pranasakhi Njaan Verumoru" ( Sindhu Bhairavi ); "Avidunnen Ganam Kelkaan" ( Pahadi ), "En Prana Nayakane" ( Yamuna Kalyani ) and a romantic number, "Annu Ninte Nunakuzhi" was highly popular and sometimes regarded by critics as among the best songs in the language.

References

External links 
 

1960s Malayalam-language films
1967 films
Films about academic scandals
Films about examinations and testing
Films about the education system in India
Films directed by P. Bhaskaran
Films scored by M. S. Baburaj
Indian films based on plays